(NOTE:The AVFC site claim Connor was Scottish but, both ENFA and Joyce state he was a local player born in Birmingham)

 
James Connor, born 1867, died 1929, was a English footballer who played in the English Football League for Aston Villa and Nottingham Forest football clubs.

Early career
Nothing is recorded about how Connor came to prominence as a Footballer until two sources site that he signed for Warwick County in 1888, aged 20/21. As the Wikipedia article records Warwick County were an Association Football off-shoot of Warwickshire CCC. However, due to its proximity to the City of Birmingham the club could not compete with Football Clubs like Aston Villa. Therefore, it is not surprising that in 1889 James Connor signed for Aston Villa. He signed on 1 August 1889.

Season 1889-1890
James Connor signed for Aston Villa on 1 August 1889. However, he only got to play one game in that season. His Club & League debut was on 25 January 1890. The venue was Wellington Road, the then home of Aston Villa. Connor played Left-Half and the visitors were Bolton Wanderers. Villa lost 2–1. The Lancashire Evening Post described the match in its 25 January 1890 edition. Unfortunately, for posterity, there was no reference to Connor playing although this was his debut match.

Season 1890-1891
Connor played three times in Season 1890–1891 in what was a poor Aston Villa season finishing ninth in the League. His first match was at Molineux, Wolverhampton on 6 September 1890, Villa lost 2–1. His final appearance for the Villa first team was on Boxing Day 1890, at Wellington Road, and the visitors were Sunderland. The match finished 0-0. James Connor played at Right-Back.

1891-1893
James Connor left Aston Villa and returned to Birmingham to play for King's Heath F.C., a club for which there are no online records. He played for King's Heath for two years moving to the East Midlands in 1893 when he signed for Nottingham Forest, a Division 1 side.

Season 1893-1894
Connor signed for 'Forest' on 13 October 1893. He played five times for the Nottingham Forest first team and it was his best season as 'Forest' finished seventh in the First Division of the Football League. His club debut was on 4 November 1893 at Turf Moor, Burnley, but he got off to a losing start with a 3–1 defeat. He played at Right-Half at Burnley. His first League win was on 2 December 1893 at Deepdale, home of Preston North End. 'Forest' won 2–0. Connor' only appearance in a Home game was on 24 March 1894 at Town Ground, the visitors being Preston North End. Connor made his only League appearance as a Centre-Forward and 'Forest' won 4–2. His final League appearance was on 26 March 1894 at Stoney Lane, the then home of West Bromwich Albion. Connor was back at Right-Half and 'Forest' were beaten 3–0. Connor left 'Forest' for Heanor Town

1894
Connor signed for Heanor Town in 1894. Nothing is recorded online of how many matches he played and when he retired. He passed away in 1929 but there is no known record of where he died.

Statistics
Source:

References

English footballers
Warwick County F.C. players
Aston Villa F.C. players
Nottingham Forest F.C. players
Heanor Town F.C. players
English Football League players
1867 births
1929 deaths
Association football wing halves